Plateumaris rustica  is a species of leaf beetle native to Europe.

References

External links
Images representing Plateumaris at BOLD

Donaciinae
Beetles described in 1818
Beetles of Europe